El Camp d'en Grassot i Gràcia Nova is a borough in the city of Barcelona in Catalonia in Spain.

It is part of the district of Gràcia.

Landmarks
The façade of the old silk factory (La Sedeta) remains as a reminder of an important economic activity from 1899 to 1976.

Neighbourhoods of Barcelona
Gràcia